Acacia dissimilis, also known as the Mitchell Plateau wattle, is a shrub belonging to the genus Acacia and the subgenus Juliflorae that is endemic to a small area in north western Australia.

Description
It has villous new shoots with lemon yellow hairs. Like most species of Acacia it has phyllodes rather than true leaves.

Distribution
It is native to an area in the Kimberley region of Western Australia where it is often found growing in disturbed lateritic soils. It is known in only two locations in the northern Kimberley the first being the Mitchell Plateau where it is found growing in lateritic soils and the other being on Laplace Island where it is found growing in basalt.

See also
List of Acacia species

References

dissimilis
Acacias of Western Australia
Plants described in 2003